Sergio Carlos Díaz Lazarte also known as Sergio Díaz (born 4 October 1962 in Buenos Aires, Argentina) is a former Argentine footballer who played for clubs in Argentina, Chile, Colombia and Mexico.

Career
Offensive wheel of excellent technique, displayed his talent in several clubs at the professional level. Among those who have Independiente Medellín of Colombia; Huachipato, Cobreloa and Colo-Colo of Chile.

In Colo-Colo was instrumental in obtaining Chilean Primera División Championship 1989, playing 28 games, completing 2520 minutes, scoring 13 goals. also part of the squad Champion of Chilean Primera División Championship 1990, playing 6 games, 515 minutes scoring 1 goal

Teams
 Banfield 1978–1983
 San Lorenzo 1984
 Huachipato 1984–1986
 Cobreloa 1987
 Independiente Medellín 1988
 Colo-Colo 1989–1990
 Necaxa 1990–1991

Titles
 Colo-Colo 1989 and 1990 (Chilean Primera División Championship and Copa Chile)

References

1956 births
Living people
Argentine footballers
Argentine expatriate footballers
Club Atlético Banfield footballers
San Lorenzo de Almagro footballers
C.D. Huachipato footballers
Cobreloa footballers
Colo-Colo footballers
Club Necaxa footballers
Independiente Medellín footballers
Coquimbo Unido footballers
Chilean Primera División players
Categoría Primera A players
Expatriate footballers in Chile
Expatriate footballers in Colombia
Expatriate footballers in Mexico
Argentine expatriate sportspeople in Chile
Association footballers not categorized by position
Footballers from Buenos Aires